Zee Magic is a French-language TV channel. The channel airs popular Zee TV shows dubbed in French and its prime target is the French-speaking audience in Africa. The channel started operation on 1 October 2015 on Canal Plus Overseas Platform after the success of Zee World, an English-language channel by ZEEL. In 2015 the channel was launched in the Indian Ocean (Réunion, Madagascar, Commores, Mauritius) on the Parabole Maurice Platform.

References

External links 
 Zee Magic website

French-language television
Zee Entertainment Enterprises
Television channels based in Noida
Television channels and stations established in 2015